This is a list of the colonial vessels of New South Wales. Known as HM Colonial Ship, the ship prefix was used by ships owned and operated by a colony naval force or in the service of the colonial administration.

References

Maritime history of Australia
Colony of New South Wales
New South Wales